The Fuling or Fu Mausoleum, also known as the East Mausoleum, is the mausoleum of Nurhaci, the founding monarch of the Later Jin dynasty (subsequently posthumously recognized as an emperor of the Qing dynasty) and his wife, Empress Xiaocigao. It served as the main site for ritual ceremonies conducted by the imperial family during the entire Qing dynasty. Located in the eastern part of Shenyang city, Liaoning Province, northeastern China, Fuling has been a UNESCO World Heritage Site since 2004.

Layout
The mausoleum is an extensive architectural complex that consist of stone archway, main red gate, sacred way, cloud pillars, stone animals, a 108-step stone staircase, the Shengong Shengde Stele Pavilion, the washing room, the fruit room, the tea room, the waiting room, Long'en Gate, Long'en Hall, eastern and western side-halls, silk burning pavilion,
Lingxing Gate, the five stone sacrifice utensils, Ming pavilion, and Treasure City.

Location
The mausoleum is located in a hilly area 10,000 meters east of the old city of Shenyang.

Protection
Fuling was inscribed as a UNESCO World Heritage Site in an extension to the site Imperial Tombs of the Ming and Qing Dynasties in 2004.

References

Burial sites of imperial Chinese families
Buildings and structures in Shenyang
Qing dynasty architecture
Major National Historical and Cultural Sites in Liaoning
World Heritage Sites in China
Nurhaci